Eagle Township is one of twelve townships in Boone County, Indiana. As of the 2010 census, its population was 21,977 and it contained 8,231 housing units.

History
Pryor Brock Farmstead, Maplelawn Farmstead, Traders Point Eagle Creek Rural Historic District, and Traders Point Hunt Rural Historic District are listed on the National Register of Historic Places.

Geography

Cities and towns
 Zionsville
 Whitestown

Unincorporated towns or communities
 Eagle Village
 Royalton

Adjacent townships
 Perry (west)
 Union (north)
 Worth (northwest)
 Brown Township, Hendricks County (southwest)
 Clay Township, Hamilton County (east)
 Pike Township, Marion County (south)
 Washington Township, Hamilton County (northeast)

Major highways
  Interstate 65
  Interstate 465
  Interstate 865
  U.S. Route 421
  Indiana State Road 334

Cemeteries
The township contains six cemeteries: Clarkstown, Cox, Jones, Lincoln Memory Gardens, Pitzer, Salem and Sheets.

References
 
 United States Census Bureau cartographic boundary files

External links

 Indiana Township Association
 United Township Association of Indiana

Townships in Boone County, Indiana
Townships in Indiana